The International Facility for Food Irradiation Technology (IFFIT) was a research and training centre at the Institute of Atomic Research in Agriculture in Wageningen, Netherlands, sponsored by the Food and Agriculture Organization (FAO) of the United Nations, the International Atomic Energy Agency (IAEA) and the Dutch Ministry of Agriculture and Fisheries.

Aims
The organisation's aim was to address food loss and food safety in developing countries by speeding up the practical introduction of the food irradiation process. They achieved this by training initiatives, research and feasibility studies.

It was founded in 1978 and was operational until 1990, and during those twelve years over four hundred key personnel from over fifty countries were trained in aspects of food irradiation, making a significant contribution to the development and use of the radiation process. The Facility also co-ordinated research into the technology, economics and implementation of food irradiation, assisted in the assessment of the feasibility of using radiation to preserve foodstuffs, and evaluated trial shipments of irradiated material.

Facilities
Drums or boxes containing products were placed on rotating tables or conveyor belts, and irradiation took place by raising the source out of the pool.

Details
During IFFIT's first five years of operation, 109 scientists from 40 countries attended six training courses, five of them being general training courses on food irradiation and the sixth being a specialised course on public health aspects. IFFIT also evaluated shipments of irradiated mangoes, spices, avocado, shrimp, onions and garlic, and produced 46 reports.

One trainee noted that Professor D. A. A. Mossel (1918–2004) assisted with the training courses with what he described as "remarkably suggestive lectures and his phenomenal foreign language abilities". From 1988 onwards, Ari Brynjolfsson was director of IFFIT.

Publications
Reports produced by the International Facility for Food Irradiation Technology include:
Odamtten, G. T., & Langerak, D. I. (1980). Moisture sorption of two maize varieties kept under different ambient relative humidities . Wageningen: IFFIT.
Appiah, V., Odamtten, G. T., & Langerak, D. I. (1980). In vitro studies of the combination of heat and radiation on conidia of Aspergillus flavus Link . Wageningen: IFFIT.
Odamtten, G. T., Appiah, V., & Langerak, D. I. (1980). Studies on the technological feasibility of the application of dry or moist heat to grains and grain products prior to gamma irradiation: Short communication . Wageningen: IFFIT.
Appiah, V., Odamtten, G. T., & Langerak, D. I. (1980). The evaluation of some physical quality parameters after combined treatment of heat and radiation . Wageningen: IFFIT.
Odamtten, G. T., Appiah, V., & Langerak, D. I. (1980). In vitro studies on the effect of the combination treatment of heat and irradiation on spores of Aspergillus flavus Link NRRL 5906 . Wageningen: IFFIT.
Odamtten, G. T., Appiah, V., & Langerak, D. I. (1980). Production of Aflatoxin B1 during storage of maize grains subjected to the combination treatment of heat and gamma irradiation . Wageningen: IFFIT.
Odamtten, G. T., Appiah, V., & Langerak, D. I. (1980). Production of aflatoxin B1 by Aspergillus flavus Link in submerged static culture after combination treatment of heat and gamma irradiation . Wageningen: IFFIT.
Odamtten, G. T., Appiah, V., & Langerak, D. I. (1980). Control of moulds causing deterioration of maize grains in storage by combination treatment: A preliminary model study with Aspergillus flavus Link NRRL 5906 . Wageningen: IFFIT.
Odamtten, G. T., Appiah, V., & Langerak, D. I. (1980). Preliminary studies on the effect of the combination treatment of heat and gamma irradiation on the keeping quality of animal feed and cotton seeds . Wageningen: IFFIT.
Odamtten, G. T., Appiah, V., & Langerak, D. I. (1980). effect of the combined treatment of heat and gamma irradiation on some physical and chemical properties of maize grains: Sensory evaluation and quality of product . Wageningen: IFFIT.
Appiah, V., Odamtten, G. T., & Langerak, D. I. (1980). The technology of heat treatment of cocoa beans . Wageningen: IFFIT.
Rubio, C. T., Leveling, H. B., & Stegeman, H. (1980). Combined effects of water activity, radiation, heating and storage on the survival and regrowth of Enterobacteriaceae in Chilean fish meal . Wageningen: IFFIT.
Appiah, V., Odamtten, G. T., & Langerak, D. I. (1980). The effect of mild heat treatment and irradiation on aubergines infected with Botrytis cinerea . Wageningen: IFFIT.
Farkas, J. (1981). Objectives and current activities of the International Facility for Food Irradiation Technology . Wageningen: IFFIT.
Langerak, D. I. (1981). Travel report of an IFFIT consulting assignment in Egypt, 24th May-3rd June 1981 . Wageningen: IFFIT.
Nyambati, M. G. O., & Langerak, D. I. (1981). Effect of gamma radiation, mild heat and potassium metabisulphite on the development of Penicillium digitatum and on physiological characteristics in stored lime fruit . Wageningen: IFFIT.
Ofori-Appiah, M. A. (1981). Application of lyoluminescence dosimetry system in food irradiation technology . Wageningen: IFFIT.
Shirzad, B. M., & Langerak, D. I. (1981). The effect of gamma radiation, pectolytic enzymes and combined treatment on the juice yield of grapes . Wageningen: IFFIT.
Farkas, J. (1981). Microbiological implications of food irradiation . Wageningen: IFFIT.
Farkas, J. (1981). Irradiation of spices and condiments . Wageningen: IFFIT.
International Facility for Food Irradiation Technology IFFIT, Wageningen. (1981). Annual report... of the International Facility for Food Irradiation Technology . Wageningen: IFFIT.
Nyambati, M. G. O., & Langerak, D. I. (1981). effect of gamma radiation and pectolytic enzymes on lime juice production and its organoleptic quality . Wageningen: IFFIT.
Sudarsan, P. (1981). Final report of a 12-day IFFIT consulting assignment in the Philippines on techno-economic feasibility of food irradiation . Wageningen: IFFIT.
Shirzad, B. M., & Langerak, D. I. (1981). Gamma irradiation technological feasibility of increasing shelf-life of table grapes . Wageningen: IFFIT.
Purwanto, Z. I., Langerak, D. I., & Dren, M. D. A.. (1982). Effect of a combination of packaging and irradiation on the chemical and sensoric quality of ground nutmeg during storage under tropical conditions . Wageningen: IFFIT.
Farkas, J., Olorunda, A. O., & Andrassy, E. (1982). Preliminary, small-scale feasibility studies on irradiation of some Nigerian foodstuffs . Wageningen: IFFIT.
Farkas, J. (1982). Feasibility of food irradiation processes to developing countries . Wageningen: IFFIT.
Alli, O. A., Langerak, D. I., & Duren, M. D. A.. (1982). Effect of irradiation, heat, thiabendazole and their combination of the shelf-life and quality of tomatoes . Wageningen: IFFIT.
Farkas, J. (1983). Recent developments in implementsation of food irradiation: Draft . Wageningen: IFFIT.
Dimitrova, R. G. (1983). Application of lyoluminescence dosimetry system in food irradiation technology . Wageningen: IFFIT.
Schmidt, K., Langerak, D. I., & Duren, M.. (1983). The effect of irradiation and/or heat treatment on the phytoalexin accumulation in potatoes var. Bintje . Wageningen: IFFIT.
Prachasitthisakdi, Y., Mossel, D. A. A., & Vries, J.. (1983). Lethality and flora shift of the psychrotrophic and meophilic bacterial association of frozen shrimps and chicken after radicidation . Wageningen: IFFIT.
Ang, L. A., Langerak, D. I., & Duren, M. D. A.. (1983). Evaluation of Philippine mangoes air-shipped to the Netherlands . Wageningen: IFFIT.
Shrif, M. M., Langerak, D. I., & Duren, M. D. A.. (1983). The effect of heat, salicylic acid, irradiation and their combination on rot in potatoes . Wageningen: IFFIT.
Shrif, M. M., Heins, H. G., & Langerak, D. I. (1983). Pilot-scale storage and quality evaluation of potatoes and onions . Wageningen: IFFIT.
Kuruppu, D. P., Schmidt, K., & Langerak, D. I. (1983). The effect of irradiation and fumigation on the antioxidative properties of some spices . Wageningen: IFFIT.
Kuruppu, D. P., Langerak, D. I., & Duren, M. D. A.. (1983). Effect of [gamma]-irradiation, fumigation and storage time on volatile oil content of some spices . Wageningen: IFFIT.
Soedarman, H., Stegeman, H., & Farkas, J. (1983). Decontamination of black pepper by gamma radiation . Wageningen: IFFIT.
Saputra, T. S., Farkas, J., & Maha, M. (1984). Trial intercountry shipment of irradiated spices . Wageningen: IFFIT.
Jan, M., Langerak, D. I., & Wolters, T. C. (1984). The effect of packaging and storage conditions on the keeping quality of walnuts treated with an desinfestation dose of gamma rays: Draft . Wageningen: IFFIT.
Ahmed, M. S. H., Hameed, A. A., & Kadhum, A. A. (1984). Comparative evaluation of trial shipments of fumigated and radiation desinfested dates from Iraq . Wageningen: IFFIT.
Dinh, N. L. (1984). Application of lyoluminescence dosimetry system in food irradiation technology . Wageningen: IFFIT.
Farkas, J. (1984). Radiation decontamination of dry food ingredients and processing aids . Wageningen: IFFIT.
Farkas, J. (1984). Five years' experience of the International Facility for Food Irradiation Technology . Wageningen: IFFIT.
Ang, L. A., Langerak, D. I., & Duren, M. D. A.. (1984). Comparative evaluation of untreated and radurized Chilean avocadoes shipped to the Netherlands . Wageningen: IFFIT.
Islam, M. S., Langerak, D. I., & Wolters, T. C. (1985). The effect of the combined treatment of heat and irradiation, and the combination of different chemicals and irradiation on rot in potatoes stored at 20 [degrees] C[elsius], 90 [percent] RH and 15 [degrees] C[elsius], 90 [percent] RH . Wageningen: IFFIT.
Toofanian, F., Stegeman, H., & Streutjens, E. (1985). Comparative effect of ethylene oxide and gamma irradiation on the chemical, sensory and microbial quality of ginger cinnamon, fennel and fenugreek . Wageningen: IFFIT.
Dhirabhava, W., Langerak, D. I., & Farkas, J. (1985). The effect of irradiation, hot water treatment and their combination on the fungal spoilage and quality of tomatoes . Wageningen: IFFIT.
Islam, M. S., Langerak, D. I., & Wolters, T. C. (1985). The effect of low dose irradiation on the physico-chemical changes in potatoes during storage at 10 [degrees] C[elsius], 85 [percent] RH . Wageningen: IFFIT.
Langerak, D. I., Wolters, T. C., & Bogunovic, M. (1985). The effect of irradiation and wrapping on the keeping quality of Yugoslav strawberries, airshipped to The Netherlands and stored at 10 [degrees] C[elsius], 85 [percent] RH . Wageningen: IFFIT.
Kim, J. H., Stegeman, H., & Farkas, J. (1986). Preliminary studies on radiation resistance of thermophilic anaerobic spores and the effect of gamma radiation on their heat resistance . Wageningen: IFFIT.
Wongchinda, N., Stegeman, H., & Farkas, J. (1986). Effects of gamma irradiation followed by temperature abuse on the psychrotrophic and mesophilic microbial association of tropical shrimps . Wageningen: IFFIT.
Langerak, D. I., Wolters, T. C., & Curzio, O. A. (1987). The effect of irradiation on the keeping quality of garlic after a trialshipment from Argentina . Wageningen: IFFIT.
El-Buzedi, M., Langerak, D. I., & Wolters, T. C. (1988). The effect of heat, irradiation, packaging and their combination on the control of rot, caused by Penicillium spp, and on the keeping quality of lemons . Wageningen: IFFIT.
Quan, V. H., Oularbi, S., & Langerak, D. I. (1988). Effect of wound healing period and temperature, irradiation and post-irradiation storage temperature on the keeping quality of potatoes . Wageningen: IFFIT.
Quan, V. H., Langerak, D. I., & Wolters, T. C. (1988). Application of different dosimeter systems and determination of dose distribution in irradiated products . Wageningen: IFFIT.
Oularbi, S., Quan, V. H., & Tayeb, Y. (1988). Effect of wound healing period and temperature, irradiation dose and post-irradiation storage temperature on the rot incidence of potatoes, after infection with Fusarium sulfurium . Wageningen: IFFIT.
Goa, D., Langerak, D. I., & Wolters, T. C. (1988). Dosimetry and dose distribution in a food irradiation facility . Wageningen: IFFIT.
El-Buzedi, M., Langerak, D. I., & Wolters, T. C. (1988). Effect of heat, irradiation, packaging and their combination on the keeping quality of tomatoes artificially infected with Botrytis cinerea . Wageningen: IFFIT.
Goa, D., Langerak, D. I., & Wolters, T. C. (1988). Effect of irradiation on the keeping quality of yams from Cote d'Ivoire . Wageningen: IFFIT.
Langerak, D. I., Wolters, T. C., & Biagio, R. M. S. (1988). Quality evaluation of papayas combination treated with heat and irradiation: A sea-borne trial shipment from Brazil . Wageningen: IFFIT.
Yakoubi, T., Langerak, D. I., & Wolters, T. C. (1988). Application of dosimetry systems in food irradiation technology . Wageningen: IFFIT.
Elhenshir, O., & Stegeman, H. (1989). Effect of combined treatments of modified atmospheres packaging and low dose gamma irradiation on the shelf-life of fresh macckerel fillets stored in ice at 2 [degrees] C[elsius]: Draft . Wageningen: IFFIT.
El-Mongy, T., & Stegeman, H. (1989). Effect of irradiation on listeria monocytogenes in chicken: Draft . Wageningen: IFFIT.
Wolters, T. C., Langerak, D. I., & Curzio, O. A. (1989). Effect of irradiation on the keeping quality of onions after sea-borne trial-shipment from Argentina . Wageningen: IFFIT.

References

Food preservation
International organizations based in Europe
Radiation
Wageningen
Agriculture in the Netherlands